Henry Mower Rice (November 29, 1816January 15, 1894) was a fur trader and an American politician prominent in the statehood of Minnesota.

Early life
Henry Rice was born on November 29, 1816, in Waitsfield, Vermont to Edmund Rice and Ellen (Durkee) Rice.  Both Edmund and Ellen were of entirely English ancestry; their ancestors had been in New England since the early 1600s. Rice lived with family friends from an early age due to the death of his father.

When Rice was 18, he moved to Detroit, Michigan, and participated in the surveying of the canal route around the rapids of Sault Ste. Marie between Lake Superior and Lake Huron.

In 1839 Rice secured a job at Fort Snelling, near what is now Minneapolis, Minnesota. He became a fur trader with the Ho-Chunk and Chippewa (Ojibwe) Indians, attaining a position of prominence and influence. Rice was trusted by the Indians, and he was instrumental in negotiating the United States treaty with the Ojibwe Indians in 1847 by which they ceded extensive lands.

Political career
Rice lobbied for the bill to establish Minnesota Territory in 1849 and later served as its delegate to the 33rd and 34th Congresses from March 4, 1853, to March 4, 1857. His work on the Minnesota Enabling Act, passed by Congress on February 26, 1857, facilitated Minnesota's statehood.

Henry Rice was a Democrat in the wing of the Minnesota Democratic party sometimes referred to at the time as "Moccasin Democrats" because of his affiliation with the fur trade and the supplying of Indian Agency contracts. He and his one-time partner trader Henry H. Sibley, also a Democrat, had a falling out in 1849 and thereafter were political rivals, Sibley being part of the non-Rice wing of the party.

At statehood in 1858 Rice and James Shields were elected by the Minnesota legislature as Democrats to the United States Senate. Rice served from Minnesota's admittance on May 11, 1858 to March 4, 1863 in the 35th, 36th, and 37th Congresses and was not a candidate for re-election; he was an unsuccessful candidate for governor in 1865.

Rice also served as a member of the board of regents of the University of Minnesota from 1851 to 1859 and was president of the Minnesota Historical Society.

H.M. Rice participated in official or unofficial capacities in a number of Indian treaties: the 1846 Winnebago treaty at Washington, the 1847 treaties with Ojibwe at Fond du Lac (Minn) and Leech Lake (Minn.), the 1854 treaty with Ojibwe at LaPointe (Wisc), as a United States Commissioner during 1887 – 1888, with the Ojibwe of Minnesota, and is rumored to have influenced the secondary negotiations with the Dakota at St. Paul after the Senate revised the 1851 Dakota treaties of Mendota and Traverse des Sioux (Minnesota). He helped organize the Winnebago (Ho-Chunk) removal from the Neutral Ground (Iowa) in 1848 and received a federal contract to re-remove Winnebago in 1850 who had either not removed to Long Prairie (Minnesota Territory) or who had scattered away. Documentation of these activities is in the federal United States Congressional Serial Set, newspapers such as the Minnesota Pioneer and the Prairie du Chien Patriot, and William Watts Folwell's A History of Minnesota (1921).

He died on January 15, 1894, while on a visit to San Antonio, Texas.

Legacy

In 1916, the state of Minnesota donated a marble statue of Rice by Frederick Triebel to the National Statuary Hall Collection at the United States Capitol. Rice County, Minnesota is named for him. His brother Edmund Rice served in the U.S. House of Representatives.

An earlier, 1906, marble statue of Rice by Luella A. Varney Serrao was placed in the Minnesota State Capitol.

Ancestry
Henry Mower Rice was a direct descendant of Edmund Rice, an early immigrant to Massachusetts Bay Colony, as follows:

 Henry Mower Rice, son of
 Edmund Rice (March 26, 1784 – May 27, 1829), son of
 Jedediah Rice (b. April 2, 1755), son of
 Ashur Rice (July 6, 1694 – August 20, 1773), son of
 Thomas Rice (June 30, 1654 – 1747), son of
 Thomas Rice (January 26, 1626 – 1682), son of
 Edmund Rice (1594 – May 3, 1663)

Henry Mower Rice married Matilda Whitall of Richmond, Virginia, in March 1849. They resided in St. Paul, Minnesota.

See also
List of United States senators expelled or censured

References

External links

|-

|-

1816 births
1894 deaths
19th-century American politicians
Delegates to the United States House of Representatives from Minnesota Territory
Democratic Party United States senators from Minnesota
Minnesota Democrats
People from Waitsfield, Vermont
Rice County, Minnesota
United States Indian agents